Måltid (Swedish for Mealtime) is the second studio album by the Swedish progressive rock band Samla Mammas Manna. Released in 1973, the album features the line-up of Coste Apetrea, Hasse Bruniusson, 
Lars Hollmer, Lasse Krants, and Henrik Öberg.

Track listing 
Side one
 "Dundrets fröjder" - 10:43
 "Oförutsedd förlossning" - 3:10
 "Den återupplivade låten" - 5:53
Side two
 "Folkvisa i morse" - 2:07
 "Syster system" - 2:27
 "Tärningen" - 3:33
 "Svackorpoängen" - 3:11
 "Minareten" - 8:21
 "Værelseds tilbud" - 2:26
Bonus tracks on CD
 "Minareten II"
 "Circus Apparatha"
 "Probably the Probably"

Personnel 
 Coste Apetrea - guitars, vocals (except song 11) 
 Hasse Bruniusson - drums, percussion, backing vocals, glass 
 Lars Hollmer - acoustic & electric pianos, vocals 
 Lasse Krants – bass, vocals
 Henrik Öberg - congas (11)

Credits 
Engineered and mixed by Anders Lind.

References 

1973 albums
Samla Mammas Manna albums